was a town located in Soo District, Kagoshima Prefecture, Japan. It is also known as Iwagawa.

As of 2003, the town had an estimated population of 12,941 and the density of 88.89 persons per km2. The total area was 145.58 km2.

On July 1, 2005, Ōsumi, along with the towns of Sueyoshi and Takarabe (all from Soo District), was merged to create the city of Soo and no longer exists as an independent municipality.

Festivals 
Osumi (Iwagawa) is the home to the Yagorodon Festival that is held in November.

References 
 Japanese Wikipedia article on Soo District

External links 
 Official website of Soo 

Dissolved municipalities of Kagoshima Prefecture